Alice Moroni (born 21 February 1991) is an Italian former professional tennis player.

A right-handed player from Bergamo in the north of Italy, Moroni reached a best ranking of 377 in the world and won four singles titles and one doubles title on the ITF Circuit.

At the 2009 Italian Open, she made the second round of singles qualifying, and received a wildcard into the doubles main draw, partnering fellow Italian Nastassja Burnett.

ITF finals

Singles: 8 (4–4)

Doubles: 5 (1–4)

References

External links
 
 

1991 births
Living people
Italian female tennis players
Sportspeople from Bergamo
21st-century Italian women